Sarauti is the district headquarters of the Arwal district in the Indian state of Bihar.

Geography
Sarauti is located on the bank of Son River.

History
Sarauti is one of the village in Arwal Block in Arwal district of Bihar. The total population of the village is 3,088 . The literacy rate is 55.45% . The female literacy rate is 39.36% . The male literacy rate is 69.71%.

The number of households in Sarauti is 515. Female to male ratio of Sarauti is 92.04%. Female to male ratio of the village is less than state's female to male ratio 91.93%. The literacy rate of the village is 55.45% compared to the literacy rate of state 47%. The female literacy rate is 39.36% compared to male literacy rate of 69.71%.

The total working population is 68.2% of the total population. 68.89% of the men are working population . 67.42% of the women are working population. The main working population is 44.31% of the total population. 52.78% of the men are main working population . 34.76% of the women are main working population. While the marginal working population is 23.89% of the total population. 16.11% of the men are marginal working population. 32.66% of the women are marginal working population. The total non working population is 31.8% of the total population. 31.11% of the men are non working population. 32.58% of the women are non working population.

References

External links

Villages in Arwal district